The 2005–06 English Hockey League season took place from September 2005 until June 2006.

The men's title was won by Cannock for the fourth consecutive year with the women's title going to Leicester. There were no playoffs to determine champions after the regular season but there was a competition for the top four clubs called the Super Cup which was held at Cannock Hockey Club from June 16–18.

The Men's Cup was won by Reading and the Women's Cup was won by Bowdon Hightown.

Men's Premier Division League standings

Results

Women's Premier Division League standings

Men's Super Cup standings

Women's Super Cup standings

Men's Cup

Quarter-finals

Semi-finals

Final 
(Held at the Reading on 2 April)

Women's Cup

Quarter-finals

Semi-finals

Final 
(Held at Reading on 2 April)

References 

England Hockey League seasons
field hockey
field hockey
England